Olenecamptus superbus is a species of beetle in the family Cerambycidae. It was described by Pic in 1908.

References

Dorcaschematini
Beetles described in 1908